At the Right Moment is a 2000 Italian comedy film written and directed by Giorgio Panariello.

The film narrates the story of a local news reporter who became popular after filming live the sudden collapse of the Leaning Tower of Pisa.

Cast
Giorgio Panariello as Livio Perozzi
Kasia Smutniak as Serena
Luisa Corna as Lara
Giovanni Cacioppo as Gaetano
Carlo Pistarino as Pacini
Evelina Gori as granma Caterina
Athina Cenci as chief of Tele Luna
Riccardo Garrone as TG director
Andrea Buscemi as Calboli
Luca Calvani as Brad Klein
Gianni Zullo as Kurt Harbacht

References

External links

2000 films
2000s Italian-language films
2000 comedy films
Italian comedy films
Films set in Tuscany
Films set in Pisa
Films shot in Tuscany
2000s Italian films